In comics, Olympian Gods may refer to:

 Olympian Gods (DC Comics)
 Olympians (Marvel Comics)

It may also refer to:
 Olympian (comics), a DC Comics superhero

See also
Olympian (disambiguation)
Olympus (comics), a number of locations and series